Robert Henry "Red" Lytle (August 9, 1916 – February 18, 1998) was an American professional basketball player. He played for the Warren Penns in the National Basketball League for one game during the 1937–38 season. In college, Lytle played football and basketball for Edinboro University of Pennsylvania.

After his brief professional basketball career, Lytle was a school teacher and coached high school football in Pennsylvania and then Ohio.

References

External links
Edinboro Hall of Fame entry

1916 births
1998 deaths
American men's basketball players
Basketball players from Pennsylvania
Edinboro Fighting Scots football players
Edinboro Fighting Scots men's basketball players
Forwards (basketball)
High school football coaches in Ohio
High school football coaches in Pennsylvania
People from Warren, Pennsylvania
Players of American football from Pennsylvania
Warren Penns players